Icemat is a manufacturer, distributor and online retailer of a line of products targeted primarily at computer gamers. The company was founded in 2001 as a producer of mousing surfaces made of frosted glass. They have since expanded their product line to include headphones, sound cards and apparel. Icemat was seen often to produce partnerships with professional gaming teams and to sponsor events and individual players.

Icemat is now known as SteelSeries, and Icemat's website now redirects there. In 2007, SteelSeries decided to merge both brands. The SteelSeries Experience I-2 is the newest generation of the original glass Icemats.

In popular culture 
The Icemat Siberia headphones are featured in the Basshunter music video "Vi sitter i Ventrilo och spelar DotA".

References

External links
 Review of the Icemat Original 
 Review of the Icemat 2nd Edition
 New edition of the glas-pad

Computer peripheral companies
Electronics companies of Denmark
Retail companies established in 2001
Companies based in Copenhagen